Yanagawa Station is the name of three train stations in Japan:

Yanagawa Station (Fukushima)
Yanagawa Station (Okayama)
Yanagawa Station (Yamanashi)